The 35º Propecia Rally New Zealand, the fourth round of the 2005 World Rally Championship season took place from April 8–10, 2005.

Results

Special stages
All dates and times are NZST (UTC+12).

References

External links
 Results at eWRC.com

New Zealand
2005
Rally
April 2005 sports events in New Zealand